Anup Phukan is a former member of Asom Gana Parishad politician from Assam. He was elected in Assam Legislative Assembly election in 2006 from Tingkhong constituency.

References 

Living people
Asom Gana Parishad politicians
Assam MLAs 2006–2011
People from Dibrugarh district
Year of birth missing (living people)